Blade Ridge is a sharp rock ridge marked by three peaks, the highest at , forming the northwest wall of Depot Glacier near the head of Hope Bay, in the northeast part of Trinity Peninsula. It was discovered by the Swedish Antarctic Expedition, 1901–04, under Otto Nordenskiöld. The descriptive name was given by the Falkland Islands Dependencies Survey following their survey of the area in 1945.

See also
Eddy Col
Whitten Peak

References
 

Ridges of Graham Land
Landforms of Trinity Peninsula